Daniel McLaughlin Therrell High School is a public high school located near Interstate 285 and Greenbriar Mall in southwest Atlanta, Georgia, United States.

Three schools operate at the Therrell campus:
D. M. Therrell School of Health Science and Research
D. M. Therrell School of Law, Government and Public Policy
School for Technology, Engineering, Math and Science at Therrell (STEMS)

Alma mater
The school's alma mater, performed only at graduation and during anniversary celebrations, was composed in the early days of Therrell High School.

Athletics
The Therrell High School Panthers compete in region 6-AA classification. The Therrell Lady Panthers track and field team captured its first AAA state championship since 1989 in 2007.
The Therrell High School Panthers Boys' Basketball Team won the 2019 State AA GHSA Basketball Championship.

Notable alumni
 Chet Grimsley, sports Hall of Famer, author of The White Golden Bull
 Winford Hood, retired NFL player
 Mac McWhorter, Texas Longhorns football offensive line coach
 New Jack, retired professional wrestler
 Polow Da Don, rapper and producer
 Herman 'Skip' Mason, historian, archivist, and former President of Alpha Phi Alpha Fraternity, Inc
 Kelvin Pritchett, retired NFL player
 Tim Roberts, retired NFL player
 Sleepy Brown, R&B singer and producer
 Sedale Threatt, retired NBA player
 Rick Waits, MLB pitcher 
 Lynn Westmoreland, former member of the U.S. House Of Representatives
 Young Dro, rapper
 Anthony Edwards, NBA player
 Verda Colvin, Georgia Supreme Court Justice

Therrell High School has an active alumni association. D.M. Therrell High School Alumni Association, Inc. was established in April 2010. The D.M. Therrell High School Alumni Scholarship Fund was also established in April 2010. The alumni's annual weekend is the main fundraiser of the organization, with the first being held October 15–17, 2010.

References

External links
The official D.M. Therrell High School Alumni Association, Inc.
D. M. Therrell School of Health Science and Research
D. M. Therrell School of Law, Government and Public Policy
School for Technology, Engineering, Math and Science at Therrell
Atlanta Public Schools, Office of High Schools

1960 establishments in Georgia (U.S. state)
Atlanta Public Schools high schools
Educational institutions established in 1960
Educational institutions in the United States with year of establishment missing